Robert Louis Carpenter (December 12, 1917 – October 19, 2005), was an American Major League Baseball pitcher who played from 1940 to 1942, and again from 1946 to 1947, with the New York Giants and the Chicago Cubs. He batted and threw right-handed.

Carpenter served with the Army during World War II.

Carpenter was born in Chicago and died in Evergreen Park, Illinois.

References

External links

1917 births
2005 deaths
Major League Baseball pitchers
Baseball players from Wisconsin
New York Giants (NL) players
Chicago Cubs players
Nashville Vols players
United States Army personnel of World War II